Darnytskyi District, is an urban district of the Ukrainian capital Kyiv.

It is the southeastern district of Kyiv located on the left bank of Dnipro river. It borders the Holosiivskyi District of the city to its west, across the river, Dniprovskyi District of city to its north, and the Brovary Raion of the Kyiv Oblast to its east and Boryspil Raion of Kyiv Oblast to its east and south. The population of the city raion is estimated around 348,000 inhabitants.

Historical background
Although an exact date of establishment of the area is not known, there is evidence that during the 4th and 3rd centuries BC, a Neolithic settlement existed near lake Svyatyshche. During the 9th century, Darnytsia was an important center of the Kyivan Rus', where ambassadors and delegations from other powers were housed while waiting to meet the kniaz and offer gifts. This gave the area its name Darnytsia (derived from Slavic/Ukrainian dar, meaning gift).

While throughout the 19th century the area was progressively becoming more densely populated, the dwellers were technically residing outside of Kyiv in village-like (but non-village by status) settlements called Slobidkas (Sloboda, Slobodka in Russian). Certain parts on Darnytsia still bear the names of the Slobidka they displaced (notably Mykilska Sloboda St. Nicholas Settlement).

Until the late 19th century, the name Darnytsia was commonly applied to the plain on the left bank of Dnipro river across from the Kyiv city center. Up to the Bolshevik Revolution in 1917, the area was legally part of the Chernigov Governorate (Chernihiv), despite being adjacent to Kyiv, also a center of its Guberniya, with the Dnipro river being the official division line. The village of Nova-Darnytsia and the rest of the area of the today's raion were incorporated into the city of Kyiv in 1927. In 1935 Darnytsia became a separate raion of the city. With establishment of the Kyiv city Darnytsia Raion, villages Pozniaky and Osokorky were merged and liquidated as separate populated localities.

The urbanized area started industrializing between World War I and World War II, after becoming a part of Kyiv. Following World War II, the area underwent a major reconstruction and modernization and became heavily industrialized, with the installation of chemical, textile, pharmaceutical and food processing industries. Major infrastructure projects, including heat-and-power co-generation units, railroad stations, highways and Metro lines were accomplished. Several research institutes found their new home here, including three major chemical institutes of the National Academy of Sciences of Ukraine.

Overview
Today, the term Darnytsia is sometimes broadly (but incorrectly) applied to the entire Left Bank area of Kyiv, except the distant areas of Vyhurivschyna-Troieshchyna to the North and Pozniaky to the South. Formally, the district underwent many border changes, and today encompasses approximately one-third of the Left Bank. A planned district change could make Darnytsia district either expand to encompass half of the Left Bank area or cease to exist being redistributed between Desnianskyi District and Dniprovskyi District.

 Neighborhood
The Darnytsia neighborhood borders are generally understood to be:

 Mykil'ska Slobidka, Rusanivka Island and Berezniaky to the West
 Voskresenka, Troyeshchyna and Lisovyi masyv to the North
 Bykivnia neighborhood and the town of Bortnychi to the East
 Pozniaky, Osokorky and Kharkivskyi masyvs to the South

See also
 Subdivisions of Kyiv
 New Darnytskyi Bridge

References

External links
  darn.kyivcity.gov.ua - Darnytskyi Raion Administration website
  Дарниця in Wiki-Encyclopedia Kyiv

Urban districts of Kyiv